The following articles relate to the history, geography, geology, flora, fauna, structures and recreation in Glacier National Park (U.S.), the U.S. portion of the Waterton-Glacier International Peace Park.

Glacier National Park History

 Exploration
 People
 Explorers
Norman Clyde, mountaineer with many first ascents
 James Willard Schultz, author, guide, responsible for naming a great many Glacier peaks, passes and lakes.
 John Frank Stevens, first European to discover Marias Pass, 1889
 Frank B. Wynn, first to climb the highest peak in the park, 1920
 Park superintendents and administrators
 Park rangers
 Engineers and architects
 Photographers, artists and illustrators
 Naturalists and scientists
 George Bird Grinnell - Early naturalist promoting Glacier
 A. Starker Leopold - author of the 1963 Leopold Report-Wildlife Management in the National Parks
 Military
 Politicians
 William Howard Taft - U.S. President who signed law creating Glacier, May 11, 1910
 Henry L. Stimson - Politician and promoter of creating the park
 Promoters
 Louis W. Hill, Great Northern Railway 
 Historic events
 History of the National Park Service
 Mission 66 - National Park Service ten-year program to prepare parks for 1966 50th Anniversary
 Advocates
 Concessionaires
 Don Hummel
 Glacier Park Company
 James Jerome Hill, Chief executive of Great Northern Railway

Geography

 Glaciers
 Retreat of Glaciers in Rocky Mountains
 Agassiz Glacier
 Ahern Glacier
 Baby Glacier
 Blackfoot Glacier
 Boulder Glacier
 Carter Glaciers
 Chaney Glacier
 Dixon Glacier
 Gem Glacier
 Grinnell Glacier
 Harris Glacier
 Harrison Glacier
 Herbst Glacier
 Hudson Glacier
 Ipasha Glacier
 Jackson Glacier
 Kintla Glacier
 Logan Glacier
 Lupfer Glacier
 Miche Wabun Glacier
 North Swiftcurrent Glacier
 Old Sun Glacier
 Piegan Glacier
 Pumpelly Glacier
 Pumpkin Glacier
 Rainbow Glacier
 Red Eagle Glacier
 Sexton Glacier
 Shepard Glacier
 Siyeh Glacier
 Sperry Glacier
 Swiftcurrent Glacier
 The Salamander Glacier
 Thunderbird Glacier
 Two Ocean Glacier
 Vulture Glacier
 Weasel Collar Glacier
 Whitecrow Glacier
 Lakes
 Akaiyan Lake
 Arrow Lake
 Atsina Lake
 Aurice Lake
 Avalanche Lake
 Beaver Woman Lake
 Bench Lake
 Bowman Lake
 Boy Lake
 Buffalo Woman Lake
 Camas Lake
 Carcajou Lake
 Cerulean Lake
 Cobalt Lake
 Cosley Lake
 Cracker Lake
 Elizabeth Lake
 Falling Leaf Lake
 Feather Woman Lake
 Fishercap Lake
 Gem Lake
 Glenns Lake
 Goat Lake
 Goat Haunt Lake
 Grace Lake
 Green Lake
 Gunsight Lake
 Gyrfalcon Lake
 Harrison Lake
 Helen Lake
 Hidden Lake
 Iceberg Lake
 Ipasha Lake
 Jackstraw Lake
 Kaina Lake
 Katoya Lake
 Kennedy Lake
 Kintla Lake
 Kootenai Lakes
 Lake Ellen Wilson
 Lake Evangeline
 Lake Frances
 Lake Isabel
 Lake Josephine (Montana)
 Lake McDonald
 Lake Nooney
 Lake of the Seven Winds
 Lake Sherburne
 Lake Wurdeman
 Lena Lake
 Lincoln Lake
 Logging Lake
 Lonely Lakes
 Lower Quartz Lake
 Lower Two Medicine Lake
 Margaret Lake
 Medicine Grizzly Lake
 Medicine Owl Lake
 Miche Wabun Lake
 Middle Quartz Lake
 Mokowanis Lake
 Morning Star Lake
 Nahsukin Lake
 Natahki Lake
 No Name Lake
 Oldman Lake
 Otatso Lake
 Otokomi Lake
 Pitamakan Lake
 Poia Lake
 Pray Lake
 Ptarmigan Lake
 Quartz Lake
 Red Eagle Lake
 Redhorn Lake
 Redrock Lake
 Rogers Lake
 Ruger Lake
 Running Crane Lake
 Saint Mary Lake
 Shaheeya Lake
 Slide Lake
 Snow Moon Lake
 Snyder Lake
 Stoney Indian Lake
 Striped Elk Lake
 Sue Lake
 Swiftcurrent Lake
 Three Bears Lake
 Trout Lake
 Twin Lakes
 Two Medicine Lake
 Upper Grinnell Lake
 Upper Snyder Lake
 Upper Two Medicine Lake
 Wahseeja Lake
 Whitecrow Lake
 Windmaker Lake
 Young Man Lake
 Mountains
 Ahern Peak
 Allen Mountain
 Almost-a-Dog Mountain
 Amphitheater Mountain
 Anaconda Peak
 Apikuni Mountain
 Appistoki Peak
 Bad Marriage Mountain
 Battlement Mountain
 Bear Mountain
 Bearhat Mountain
 Bearhead Mountain
 Bishops Cap
 Blackfoot Mountain
 Boulder Peak
 Brave Dog Mountain
 Campbell Mountain
 Caper Peak
 Cathedral Peak
 Chapman Peak
 Church Butte
 Chief Mountain
 Citadel Mountain
 Clements Mountain
 Cloudcroft Peaks
 Cracker Peak
 Crowfeet Mountain
 Curly Bear Mountain
 Divide Mountain
 Eagle Plume Mountain
 Eagle Ribs Mountain
 Eaglehead Mountain
 East Flattop Mountain
 Edwards Mountain
 Flinsch Peak
 Fusillade Mountain
 Gable Mountain
 Goat Haunt Mountain
 Goat Mountain
 Going-to-the-Sun Mountain
 Grizzly Mountain
 Gunsight Mountain
 Heavens Peak
 Iceberg Peak
 Ipasha Peak
 Kaina Mountain
 Kinnerly Peak
 Kintla Peak
 Kootenai Peak
 Kupunkamint Mountain
 Lewis Range
 Little Chief Mountain
 Little Dog Mountain
 Livingston Range
 Logging Mountain
 Lone Walker Mountain
 Long Knife Peak
 Longfellow Peak
 Mad Wolf Mountain
 Mahtotopa Mountain
 Matahpi Peak
 McClintock Peak
 McPartland Mountain
 Medicine Grizzly Peak
 Medicine Owl Peak
 Miche Wabun Peak
 Mount Cleveland
 Mount Brown
 Mount Cannon
 Mount Carter
 Mount Custer
 Mount Despair
 Mount Doody
 Mount Ellsworth
 Mount Geduhn
 Mount Gould
 Mount Grinnell
 Mount Helen
 Mount Henkel
 Mount Henry
 Mount Jackson
 Mount James
 Mount Kipp
 Mount Logan
 Mount Merritt
 Mount Morgan
 Mount Oberlin
 Mount Peabody
 Mount Phillips
 Mount Pinchot
 Mount Rockwell
 Mount Saint Nicholas
 Mount Siyeh
 Mount Stimson
 Mount Thompson
 Mount Vaught
 Mount Wilbur
 Nahsukin Mountain
 Natoas Peak
 Norris Mountain
 Numa Peak
 Parke Peak
 Paul Bunyans Cabin
 Peril Peak
 Piegan Mountain
 Pollock Mountain
 Pyramid Peak
 Rainbow Peak
 Razoredge Mountain
 Red Eagle Mountain
 Red Mountain
 Redhorn Peak
 Reuter Peak
 Reynolds Mountain
 Rising Wolf Mountain
 Sarcee Mountain
 Seward Mountain
 Shaheeya Peak
 Sheep Mountain
 Sherburne Peak
 Sinopah Mountain
 Split Mountain
 Square Peak
 Stoney Indian Peaks
 Summit Mountain
 Swiftcurrent Mountain
 The Guardhouse
 Thunderbird Mountain
 Tinkham Mountain
 Triple Divide Peak
 Vigil Peak
 Vulture Peak
 Wahcheechee Mountain
 Walton Mountain
 White Calf Mountain
 Wolftail Mountain
 Wynn Mountain
 Yellow Mountain
 Rivers
 Middle Fork Flathead River
 North Fork Flathead River
 Waterfalls
 Bird Woman Falls
 Weeping Wall
 Specific areas
 Iceberg Cirque
 Two Medicine
 Roads and passes
 Big Drift
 Going-to-the-Sun Road
 Logan Pass
 Marias Pass

Geology

 Geologic formations
 Appekunny Formation
 Lewis Overthrust
 Belt Supergroup

Flora

Fauna

 Bighorn sheep
 Canadian lynx
 Grizzly bear
 Elk
 Gray wolf
 Leopold Report - Seminal 1963 Study: "Wildlife Management In The National Parks"
 Mountain goat

Districts and structures

 Districts
 Belly River Ranger Station Historic District
 Cut Bank Ranger Station Historic District
 East Glacier Ranger Station Historic District
 Great Northern Railway Buildings
 Headquarters Historic District
 Kintla Lake Ranger Station
 Kishenehn Ranger Station Historic District
 Logging Creek Ranger Station Historic District
 Many Glacier
 Nyack Ranger Station Historic District
 Polebridge Ranger Station Historic District
 Saint Mary Ranger Station
 St. Mary Utility Area Historic District
 Sherburne Ranger Station Historic District
 Swiftcurrent Auto Camp Historic District
 Swiftcurrent Ranger Station Historic District
 Upper Lake McDonald Ranger Station Historic District
 Walton Ranger Station Historic District

 Historic Structures, Hotels and Lodges
 Belton Chalets
 Glacier Park Lodge
 Granite Park Chalet
 Gunsight Pass Shelter
 Lake McDonald Lodge
 Logan Pass Visitor Center
 Many Glacier Barn and Bunkhouse
 Many Glacier Hotel
 Rising Sun Auto Camp
 Roes Creek Campground Camptender's Cabin
 Sperry Chalet
 Swanson Boathouse
 Two Medicine Campground Camptender's Cabin
 Two Medicine Store
 West Entrance Station
 Fire lookouts
 Apgar Fire Lookout
 Heaven's Peak Fire Lookout
 Huckleberry Fire Lookout
 Loneman Fire Lookout
 Mount Brown Fire Lookout
 Numa Ridge Fire Lookout
 Scalplock Mountain Fire Lookout
 Swiftcurrent Fire Lookout

 Ranger patrol cabins
 Bowman Lake Patrol Cabin
 Coal Creek Patrol Cabin
 Ford Creek Patrol Cabin
 Goathaunt Bunkhouse
 Kootenai Creek Snowshoe Cabin
 Lee Creek Snowshoe Cabin
 Logan Creek Patrol Cabin
 Lower Logging Lake Snowshoe Cabin and Boathouse
 Lower Nyack Snowshoe Cabin
 Lower Park Creek Patrol Cabin
 Pass Creek Snowshoe Cabin
 Quartz Lake Patrol Cabin
 Slide Lake-Otatso Creek Patrol Cabin and Woodshed
 Sun Camp Fireguard Cabin
 Upper Kintla Lake Patrol Cabin
 Upper Logging Lake Snowshoe Cabin
 Upper Nyack Snowshoe Cabin
 Upper Park Creek Patrol Cabin
 Other structures
 Glacier View Dam (never built)
 Lake Sherburne Dam
 Saint Mary Visitor Center, Entrance Station and Checking Stations

Recreation
 Continental Divide Trail
 Glacier National Park Tourist Trails--Inside Trail, South Circle, North Circle
 Highline Trail (Glacier National Park)
 Ptarmigan Tunnel
 Trail of the Cedars

Media coverage

Trivia
 Polebridge to Numa Ridge Phoneline

Entrance Communities

 Apgar Village
 Babb, Montana
 Blackfeet Indian Reservation
 Browning, Montana
 Columbia Falls, Montana
 Coram, Montana
 East Glacier Park Village, Montana
 Hungry Horse, Montana
 Kalispell, Montana - Closest commercial airport to Glacier
 Polebridge, Montana
 Rising Sun (Montana)
 St. Mary, Montana
 West Glacier, Montana
 Highways
 U.S. Route 2
 U.S. Route 89

See also

 Bibliography of Glacier National Park (U.S.)

Glacier National Park (U.S.)
Glacier National Park